The 2013–14 season was the 31st season in Getafe's history and the 10th in the top-tier.

Squad
As June, 2014..

Squad and statistics

|}

Transfers

Competitions

Overall

La Liga

Copa del Rey

References

Getafe CF seasons
Getafe